Comet Borrelly  or Borrelly's Comet (official designation: 19P/Borrelly) is a periodic comet, which was visited by the spacecraft Deep Space 1 in 2001. The comet last came to perihelion (closest approach to the Sun) on February 1, 2022 and will next come to perihelion on December 11, 2028.

Deep Space 1 returned images of the comet's nucleus from 3400 kilometers away. At 45 meters per pixel, it was the highest resolution view ever seen of a comet.

Discovery 
The comet was discovered by Alphonse Borrelly during a routine search for comets at Marseilles, France on December 28, 1904.

Deep Space 1 flyby 

On September 21, 2001 the spacecraft Deep Space 1, which was launched to test new equipment in space, performed a flyby of Borrelly. It was steered toward the comet during the extended mission of the craft, and presented an unexpected bonus for the mission scientists. Despite the failure of a system that helped determine its orientation, Deep Space 1 managed to send back to Earth what were, at the time, the best images and other science data from a comet.

References

External links 
 http://jcometobs.web.fc2.com/pcmtn/0019p.htm
 19P – Gary W. Kronk's Cometography
 Elements and Ephemeris for 19P/Borrelly – Minor Planet Center

Periodic comets
0019
Comets visited by spacecraft
Comets in 2015
19041228